Grishin is a rural locality (a khutor) in Mikhaylovka Urban Okrug, Volgograd Oblast, Russia. The population was 11 as of 2010.

Geography 
Grishin is located 71 km northeast of Mikhaylovka. Talovka is the nearest rural locality.

References 

Rural localities in Mikhaylovka urban okrug